Hilary Pritchard (1942–1996) was a Manx film and television actress.

Career
Television roles included parts in The Avengers episode "Take-Over" and three episodes of the BBC's department store sitcom Are You Being Served?.  Pritchard also appeared as the "dumb blonde" in live comedy sketches in the TV consumer programme That's Life!, and played Tanya in an episode of Doctor At Large (1971).  She was originally hired to voice Princess Yum-Yum in The Thief and the Cobbler, but was later replaced by Sara Crowe for unknown reasons.

Filmography

Film

Television

References

External links
 

1942 births
British film actresses
Manx actresses
1996 deaths
British television actresses
20th-century British actresses
20th-century Manx actresses